Armed Response is a 2017 American action-horror film directed by John Stockwell, and produced by Wesley Snipes, who also stars in the lead role. The film co-stars Anne Heche, Dave Annable and Seth Rollins. The film is produced by Erebus Pictures, a collaboration between WWE Studios and Gene Simmons.
It has a 0% score on Rotten Tomatoes. The film was released in the United States on August 4, 2017.

Plot
A team of trained operatives are sent to a prison facility to investigate the disappearance of another covert operational  unit. Soon after arriving they discover the bodies of their men and then find themselves trapped inside after a full lock-down. They watch the surveillance footage of the soldiers being killed by unseen assailants, and soon after they  begin to experience strange and horrific phenomena as they attempt to uncover what is killing them!

The building is a highly evolved AI named Temple which is in effect a huge lie detector.  The team who have been killed and the team sent to rescue them had previously been on a tour of duty in Afghanistan.  Whilst in Afghanistan they were questioning a village elder and things got out of hand and they massacred the village; they have been covering this up and this is what Temple wants to expose and why they are being punished.

Cast

References

External links
 

2017 films
2017 action thriller films
2017 horror thriller films
2010s supernatural horror films
American action thriller films
American horror thriller films
American supernatural horror films
2010s English-language films
Films about death
Films about murderers
Films directed by John Stockwell
Films scored by Elia Cmíral
Films set in Louisiana
Films set in New Orleans
WWE Studios films
2010s American films